Daesung Group is a South Korean chaebol conglomerate founded by Kim Soo-Keon. The group's businesses include energy, auto parts, oil exploration and industrial gas.

References

External links

Chaebol